The Ticket Office was established in 1660 as part of the Navy Office. It administered the payment of naval wages in conjunction with the Navy Pay Office until 1829, when it was merged with the Office for Seamen's Wages where it became the Ticket and Wages Branch.

The office was administered by the Manager of Ticket Office, later by the Chief Clerk, Ticket Office.

History
The Ticket Office was established in 1660 and was part of the Comptroller of the Navy's department until 1668. It then became part of the office of Controller of Treasurer Accounts until 1672 when it became part of the Office of Extra Commissioners of the Navy. In 1673 the distinct office of Manager of the Ticket Office was established until 1674. In 1682 it was transferred back under the Comptrollers department until 1691. In 1691 it again became part of the Controller of Treasurer Accounts department. In 1829 the office was amalgamated with the Office for Seamen's Wages and was renamed the Ticket and Wages Branch.

Head of office

Manager Ticket Office
Included:

 1673-1674, T. Lewis

Chief Clerk Ticket Office
Included:
 1674-1682, W Whitfield
 1682 Jan-Nov, T.
 1682-1686, M. Hale
 1686-1689, D.  Lyddell 
 1689-1692, W. Whitfield 
 1692-1727, M. Howen 
 1727-1732, W. Burton 
 1732-1739, J. Phillipson 
 1739-1750, J. Rossington 
 1750-1774, E. Bentham 
 1774-1789, W. Paynter 
 1789-1808, J. Hunter 
 1808-1821, G. Daysh 
 1821-1826, S. Inman 
 1826-1829, J. Lance

Citations

Sources
 'Chief Clerks and Clerks: Chief Clerks', in Office-Holders in Modern Britain: Volume 7, Navy Board Officials 1660-1832, ed. J M Collinge (London, 1978), pp. 34–45. British History Online http://www.british-history.ac.uk/office-holders/vol7/pp34-45 [accessed 6 January 2019].
 'Manager of Ticket Office 1673-4', in Office-Holders in Modern Britain: Volume 7, Navy Board Officials 1660-1832, ed. J M Collinge (London, 1978), p. 26. British History Online http://www.british-history.ac.uk/office-holders/vol7/p26 [accessed 6 January 2019].

Navy Office organisations